Bob Jones University v. United States, 461 U.S. 574 (1983), was a decision by the United States Supreme Court holding that the religion clauses of the First Amendment did not prohibit the Internal Revenue Service from revoking the tax exempt status of a religious university whose practices are contrary to a compelling government public policy, such as eradicating racial discrimination.

Background 
Because of its interpretation of Biblical principles regarding interracial dating, Bob Jones University completely excluded black applicants until 1971, and from 1971 until 1975, admitted black students only if they were married. After 1975, the University began to admit unmarried black applicants, but continued to deny "admission to applicants engaged in an interracial marriage or known to advocate interracial marriage or dating." The University also imposed a disciplinary rule that prohibited interracial dating.

Under pre-1970 IRS regulations, tax exemptions were awarded to private schools regardless of their racial admissions policies, and Bob Jones University was approved for a tax exemption under that policy. Pursuant to a 1970 revision to IRS regulations that limited tax-exempt status to private schools without racially discriminatory admissions policies, the IRS informed the University on November 30, 1970, that the IRS was planning on revoking its tax exempt status as a "religious, charitable . . . or educational" institution. In response, the University filed suit in 1971 in Bob Jones University v. Schultz.

The United States District Court for the District of South Carolina granted a preliminary injunction, but the United States Court of Appeals for the Fourth Circuit reversed in 1973, citing the Anti-Injunction Act.

The University petitioned for a rehearing in the Appeals Court in Bob Jones University v. Connally. The Appeals Court ruled March 21, 1973, stating that Americans United v. Walters did not conflict with the decision in 1973.

The Supreme Court affirmed the Court of Appeals decision in Bob Jones University v. Simon (416 US 725). The case was decided May 15, 1974, in an 8–0 decision (Douglas not participating). They stated that there was a lack of proof of "irreparable injury." Justice Powell wrote the decision.

The IRS again notified the University on April 16, 1975, of the proposed revocation. Officially, the IRS revoked the University's tax exempt status on January 19, 1976. The University paid $21 in unemployment taxes for one employee for tax year 1975 and then filed for a refund in the United States District Court for the District of South Carolina. The Government counterclaimed for unpaid federal unemployment taxes for the taxable years 1971 through 1975, in the amount of $489,675.59, plus interest.

The District Court ruled December 26, 1978, that the IRS had violated the University's First Amendment rights, and ordered the IRS to refund the University the $21 of taxes that it had paid.

The United States Court of Appeals of the Fourth Circuit ruled that the case be sent back to the District Court.

Supreme Court decision 
Bob Jones University v. United States was decided May 24, 1983, in an 8–1 decision with majority opinion written by Warren E. Burger, and joined by William J. Brennan, Byron R. White, Thurgood Marshall, Harry A. Blackmun, John Paul Stevens, and Sandra Day O'Connor. The Court, speaking through Burger, read a "common law" public interest requirement into the statute governing tax-exempt charitable status, and cited Congress' refusal to intervene as proof that they approved of the IRS's construction of the statute. The Court applied a strict scrutiny analysis and found that the "Government has a fundamental, overriding interest in eradicating racial discrimination in education . . . which substantially outweighs whatever burden denial of tax benefits places on [the University's] exercise of their religious beliefs."  The Court made clear, however, that its holding dealt "only with religious schools—not with churches or other purely religious institutions."

Lewis F. Powell wrote a separate concurring opinion, emphasizing the importance of Congressional approval for administrative policy changes. William H. Rehnquist was the sole dissenter, arguing that the literal terms of the governing statute could not be read to exclude Bob Jones from charitable status.

Aftermath 
The case has been cited in many decisions that followed as well as by commentators, due to the significance of the precedent established in this case.

In 2000 BJU president Bob Jones III announced on Larry King Live that its ban on interracial dating had been dropped. The change was stimulated by a media uproar prompted by a visit of then-presidential candidate George W. Bush. In February 2017, BJU president Steve Pettit announced that Bob Jones University had regained its tax-exempt status.

See also 
 List of United States Supreme Court cases, volume 461
 Coit v. Green (1971)

Notes and references

External links

United States Supreme Court cases
United States Supreme Court cases of the Burger Court
United States free exercise of religion case law
1983 in United States case law
1983 in religion
Multiracial affairs in the United States
American Civil Liberties Union litigation
Bob Jones University